Passion Play is a dramatic presentation depicting the Passion of Christ.

Passion Play may also refer to:

Films
Passion Play (film), a 2010 film directed by Mitch Glazer

Games
Passion Play (game), a live-action role-playing game, based on the table top role-playing game Fading Suns

Literature
Passion Play, a 1979 novel by Jerzy Kosiński
Passion Play, a 1992 novel by Sean Stewart
Passion Play, a 2010 novel by Beth Bernobich

Music

Albums
A Passion Play, a 1973 album by Jethro Tull, about the journey of a recently deceased man through the afterlife
Passion Plays (album), a 1985 compilation album by The Passions
Passion Play (album), a 1994 record album by Teena Marie
Dark Passion Play, a 2007 Nightwish album

Songs
"Passion Play", a 1981 song by Janis Ian from Restless Eyes
"Passion Play", a 1983 song by Night Ranger from Midnight Madness
"Passion Play (When All the Slaves Are Free)", a 1991 song by Joni Mitchell from Night Ride Home
"Passion Play", a 1995 song by Papas Fritas  from Papas Fritas

Musicals
Passion (musical), a 1994 musical by Stephen Sondheim

Stage plays
Oberammergau Passion Play, performed since 1634
Passion Play (play), a 1981 stage play by Peter Nichols (also known as Passion for US production)
Passion Play, a 2003/2004 stage play by Sarah Ruhl

See also
Passion (disambiguation)